The Western potato leafhopper (Empoasca abrupta) are small, yellow, green or brown winged insects. That reach a length of approximately 3mm. 

Leafhoppers infest potato plants, and suck sap from potato leaves, causing a yellow mottle. Their eggs are usually laid within plant, and thus are invisible.

References

Insects described in 1931
Empoascini